Leslie Steiner may refer to:

 Leslie Morgan Steiner, American author
 Actor Leslie Howard Steiner (1893–1943), better known as Leslie Howard (actor)
 Samuel R. Delany (born 1942), who wrote under K. Leslie Steiner